The Paraguay national under-17 football team represents Paraguay in international football competitions such as FIFA U-17 World Cup and South American Under-17 Football Championship.

Overview
The under-17 Paraguay national football team has seen and delivered along the years many of Paraguay's best talents.

The team has participated in 4 events of the FIFA U-17 World Cup and their best performance came in the 1999 World Cup held in New Zealand, when Paraguay reached the quarterfinals and finished in 5th place. Their best performance at the South American level came in the 1999 tournament in Uruguay when they finished in second place, along with two third-place finishes in 2001 and 2017 as well as three fourth-place finishes in 1988, 1997 and 2015.

In 2001, el team were crowned champions of the Milk Cup after defeating Manchester United 6–0.

Tournament records

FIFA U-17 World Cup

South American Under-17 Football Championship

*Draws include knockout matches decided on penalty kicks.

Current squad
Head coach: Gustavo Morínigo

The following 21 players were named to the squad for the 2019 FIFA U-17 World Cup in Brazil from October 26 – November 17, 2019.

See also
Paraguay national football team
Paraguay national under-23 football team
Paraguay national under-20 football team
Paraguay women's national under-17 football team

References

External links
APF Website

under-17
South American national under-17 association football teams